Jordan Edgar Cravens (November 7, 1830 – April 8, 1914) was an American politician and a U.S. Representative from Arkansas, cousin of William Ben Cravens.

Biography
Born in Fredericktown, Missouri, Cravens was the son of Nehemiah and Sophia Thompson Cravens. He moved with his father to Arkansas the following year, and attended the common schools. He was graduated from the Cane Hill Academy at Boonsboro (now Canehill), Washington County, Arkansas, in 1850. He studied law and was admitted to the bar in 1854. He commenced practice in Clarksville, Arkansas, and served as member of the State house of representatives in 1860. He owned slaves. He married Emma Batson and they had five children, Jeane, Jane, Felix, Sallie, and Samuella.  Emma Batson's father was Felix Ives Batson  an Arkansas Supreme Court judge who during the American Civil War, represented the First Congressional District of northwest Arkansas in the First Confederate Congress and the Second Confederate Congress House of Representatives.

Career
Cravens entered the Confederate States Army in 1861 as a private in Company C, 17th Arkansas Infantry Regiment (Lemoyne's).  When that regiment underwent consolidation in May 1862, Cravens was elected Colonel of the new unit: the 21st Arkansas Infantry Regiment.  The 21st Arkansas was surrendered, at Vicksburg, Mississippi, on July 4, 1863.  After being declared exchanged, on September 12, 1863, Cravens' unit was consolidated with the 14th Powers' Arkansas, 15th (Northwest) Arkansas, and the 16th Arkansas, to form a new unit: the 1st Arkansas Consolidated Infantry Regiment (Trans-Mississippi) Department. He was named colonel of the new organization.

At the close of hostilities of the Civil War, Cravens returned to Clarksville where he served as prosecuting attorney of Johnson County in 1865 and 1866 and then as member of the Arkansas State Senate from 1866 until 1868.  Cravens was elected as an Independent Democrat to the Forty-fifth Congress and then reelected as a Democrat to the Forty-sixth and Forty-seventh Congresses serving from March 4, 1877, until March 3, 1883.  He was an unsuccessful candidate for renomination in 1882 to the Forty-eighth Congress. He then resumed the practice of law in Clarksville, Arkansas and served as judge of the circuit court from 1890 until 1894.

Death
Cravens died in Fort Smith, Arkansas on April 8, 1914, (age 83 years, 152 days) and is interred at Oakland Cemetery, Clarksville, Arkansas.

References

External links
 Retrieved on 2009-05-13

 

1830 births
1914 deaths
People from Madison County, Missouri
American people of English descent
Democratic Party members of the United States House of Representatives from Arkansas
Democratic Party members of the Arkansas House of Representatives
Democratic Party Arkansas state senators
Arkansas state court judges
Arkansas lawyers
American slave owners
People from Clarksville, Arkansas
19th-century American politicians
19th-century American lawyers
Confederate States Army officers
People of Arkansas in the American Civil War